Luciano Re Cecconi (1 December 1948 – 18 January 1977) was an Italian footballer, who played as a midfielder; a fast, strong, athletic, and hardworking player, known for his speed, tenacity, and stamina, he functioned as a box-to-box midfielder or as a defensive or central midfielder for his teams. He was also known for his sense of humour throughout his career; and was nicknamed l'Angelo Biondo (Italian for The Blond Angel), for the colour of his hair.

Club career
Re Cecconi made his debut for Pro Patria, then in Serie C, on 14 April 1968, and subsequently moved to Foggia, which he helped to promotion from Serie B to Serie A in the 1969–70 season (they were relegated again the following year). In 1972, he joined S.S. Lazio. He was a key member of the Lazio title-winning side of the 1973–74 Serie A season, for which he scored two goals and made 23 appearances. He also won the league with the under-21 side during 1973–74 season.

International career
Re Cecconi was called up for Italy's squad for the 1974 World Cup, and he won two caps in total during the following season in friendly matches in 1974. He also played for the Italian under-23 side, in addition to being on the roster of the Italian national squad at the 1974 World Cup.

Death
Re Cecconi was shot dead in Rome on 18 January 1977, after pretending to rob a friend's jewelry shop as a practical joke.

Honours
Lazio
Serie A: 1973–74

References

1948 births
1977 deaths
Sportspeople from the Metropolitan City of Milan
1977 crimes in Italy
Accidental deaths in Italy
Deaths by firearm in Italy
Defensive gun use
Firearm accident victims
Manslaughter victims
Italian footballers
Association football midfielders
Aurora Pro Patria 1919 players
Calcio Foggia 1920 players
S.S. Lazio players
Serie C players
Serie B players
Serie A players
Italy international footballers
1974 FIFA World Cup players
Footballers from Lombardy